Vinko Pribojević ( mid-15th century – after 1532) was a Venetian Slavic historian and ideologue, best known as one of the founders of the early pan-Slavic ideology.

Life
Pribojević was born on the island of Hvar, in Venetian Dalmatia (now Croatia). American historian John Van Antwerp Fine, Jr. emphasizes that Pribojević and Juraj Šižgorić did not consider themselves to be Croats, but rather Slavic language-speaking Venetians. Pribojević alone considered himself Dalmatian first and foremost and then Slavic, shunning the Venetian tag later in his life. He was educated in the humanist spirit and joined the Dominican Order around 1522.

His most famous work is the speech De origine successibusque Slavorum (On the Origin and Glory of the Slavs), where he exalts Illyrians and Slavs as the ancestors of the Dalmatian Slavs. His speech, most probably made in Venice in 1525, left a deep impression on the Venetians, who published it in Latin and Italian several times over the following years. Its passionate glorification of Slavs (in which the book includes Alexander the Great and Aristotle, Diocletian and Jerome) and its strong pathos played a major role in the birth of the pan-Slavic ideology. It was the first time that such ideology was formulated as a program, which was further developed by Mavro Orbini and Juraj Križanić.

Legacy
Pribojević was the first to incorporate Illyrians and their myth into the Croatian and Slavic historiography (or rather ideology), as a shield and rampart against the German, Hungarian and Italian national and territorial ambitions. His identification of Slavs as Illyrians, as well as his enthusiastic glorification of the historical greatness and importance of Illyrians, left a deep mark on world history and outlook.

In particular, in accordance with the humanist approach of the Renaissance that combined scripture with ancient myth, Pribojević claimed that the paleo-Balkanic populations such as the Illyrians, Thracians and Macedonians were of a Slavic character. Furthermore according to Pribojević, Alexander the Great, multiple Caesars and Saint Jerome were Slavs.

He was one of the most important Croatian and global Latinists who created the ideological molds of the future, is also the ancestor of the Croatian Illyrian movement of the 19th century and of the pan-Slavic ideology that was embraced by all Slavic peoples.

Works
De origine successibusque Slavorum (The Origin and Glory of Slavs), 1532. Also available in Croatian as Podrijetlo i slava Slavena, 1997

See also
Mikša Pelegrinović
Hanibal Lucić
Petar Hektorović

References

External links
A Master's thesis on Pribojević: Abstract

People from Hvar
16th-century Venetian historians
Venetian Slavs
Pan-Slavism
15th-century births
16th-century deaths
Members of the Dominican Order